Nicholas de Selby was one of two Members of Parliament for the constituency of York and the first recorded as such. He was elected during the reign of Edward I.

Life and Politics

Related to Hugh de Selby, who was mayor of York by order of the King by way of the Sheriff of York in 1217, his father having been a forester for the Abbey of Selby.

Elected to parliament 1295 on the Sunday after the feast of St Martin on 13 Nov of that year. He took the seat formally the following year.

He served as a Bayliff of the city of York in 1278, 1279 1285 during the reign of Edward I. He became the Mayor of York between 1286–89.

He held lands and tofts in Deighton near Escrick to the south of York which he passed on to his son John  His son John was an Apothecary, became a Chamberlain of York in 1317 and Bailiff of York in 1321.

References

Politicians from York
Members of the Parliament of England for constituencies in Yorkshire
English MPs 1294
English MPs 1297
13th-century births
Year of birth unknown
Year of death unknown